Tonna lischkeana is a species of large sea snail, a marine gastropod mollusk in the family Tonnidae, the tun shells.

Description
The length of the shell attains 165 mm.

Distribution
This marine species occurs off the ¨Philippines.

References

 Beu, A. G. (2005) Neogene fossil tonnoidean gastropods of Indonesia. Scripta Geologica 130, p. 1-186, pp. 166, figs. 327
 Steyn, D. G.; Lussi, M. (2005). Offshore Shells of Southern Africa: A pictorial guide to more than 750 Gastropods. Published by the authors. pp. i–vi, 1–289.
 Vos, C. (2007) A conchological Iconography (No. 13) - The family Tonnidae. 123 pp., 30 numb. plus 41 (1 col.) un-numb. text-figs, 33 maps., 63 col. pls, Conchbooks, Germany
 Vos, C. (2008) Tonnidae. in Poppe G.T. (ed.) Philippine Marine Mollusks, Volume 1: Gastropoda 1: 594-611, pls 242-250. Conchbooks, Hackenheim, Germany.
 Vos, C. (2012) Overview of the Tonnidae (MOLLUSCA: GASTROPODA) in Chinese waters. Shell Discoveries 1(1); pp. 12-22; Pls. 1-9
 Vos, C. (2013) Overview of the Tonnidae (Mollusca: Gastropoda) in Chinese waters. Gloria Maris 52(1-2); pp. 22-53; Pls. 1-9
 City University of Hong Kong. (2013). Provision of Services for Species Identification and Data Analysis ofEpibenthic Organisms from Hong Kong Water. Final report. Environmental Protection Department. Department of Biology and Chemistry, City University
 Severns, M. (2011). Shells of the Hawaiian Islands - The Sea Shells. Conchbooks, Hackenheim. 564 pp.

External links
 Küster, H. C. (1857) Die gattungen Cassis, Cassidaria, Oniscia, Dolium, Eburna und Harpa. Bearbeitet von Dr. H. C. Küster. Systematisches Conchylien-Cabinet von Martini und Chemnitz. Fortgesetzt von Hofrath Dr. H. G. v. Schubert und professor Dr. J. A. Wagner. Neu herausgegeben und ver vollständigt von Dr. H. C. Küster nach desseb Tode fortgesetzt von Dr. W. Kobelt und H. C. Weinkauff. Vol. 3, part1, section 2. Bauer & Raspe, Nürnberg. 1-104, pls. 36-79 
 Philippi, R. A. (1845). Diagnoses testaceorum quorundam novorum. Zeitschrift für Malakozoologie. 2(10): 147-152
 Hanley, S. (1860). Systematic list of the species of Dolium restricted. Proceedings of the Zoological Society of London. 1859, 27: 487-493

Tonnidae
Gastropods described in 1857